Chlorerythra is a genus of moths in the family Geometridae.

Species
 Chlorerythra borbonica Guillermet, 2004
 Chlorerythra rubriplaga Warren, 1895

References
 Chlorerythra at Markku Savela's Lepidoptera and Some Other Life Forms
 Natural History Museum Lepidoptera genus database

Cosymbiini
Geometridae genera